Sara Casadei (born 2 October 1975) is a Sammarinese swimmer. She competed in the women's 50 metre freestyle event at the 1992 Summer Olympics.

References

External links
 

1975 births
Living people
Sammarinese female swimmers
Olympic swimmers of San Marino
Swimmers at the 1992 Summer Olympics
Place of birth missing (living people)
Sammarinese female freestyle swimmers